Ord is a surname. Notable people with the surname include:

Boris Ord (1897–1961), British composer
Edward Ord (1818–1883), Major General in the US Army 
George Ord (1781–1866), American naturalist, ornithologist and writer
Harry Ord (1819–1885), the 10th Governor of Western Australia
John Ord (1729–1814), English politician
Robert Ord (1700–1778), British lawyer and politician
Toby Ord (born 1979), Australian philosopher
 William Ord (1781–1855), English politician and landowner, MP for Morpeth, and for Newcastle-upon-Tyne 
 William Ord of Fenham (c. 1715–1768), English land and mine owner, MP for Bossiney
 William Miller Ord (1834–1902), British medical scientist

English-language surnames